Candelaria, also Villa Mariana de Candelaria, is a municipality and city in the eastern part of the island of Tenerife in the Province of Santa Cruz de Tenerife, in the Canary Islands, Spain. The city is located on the coast, 17 km southwest of Santa Cruz de Tenerife. The population is 25,140 (2010), and the area is 49.18 km².

The town is noted by Catholics in Spain and Latin America as a place of veneration of the Virgin of Candelaria, the patron of the Canary Islands. The most prominent building is the Basilica of Candelaria, which includes the sculpture of the Virgin Mary (Virgin of Candelaria) and mural paintings. Also highlighted in the square, statues of the nine aboriginal kings of Tenerife.

In the times of the Guanches, the region was part of the menceyato, or kingdom, of Güímar.  A cave is situated around Candelaria. The famous Festival de la Canción de Candelaria is one of the most important festivities on the island. It celebrated its 10th anniversary in 2005.

Etymology of the name
In pre-Hispanic epochs this zone pertained to Güímar's aboriginal Menceyato. It was accepted that the aboriginal name of the zone was simply "Güímar" as the whole menceyato. After the conquest, this zone was called "Candelaria", in honor to the virgin patron of the archipelago, the Virgin of Candelaria.

History

The town of Candelaria is surrounded by several prehistoric caves, where burials have been found containing mummies of the Guanches, whose burial process is very similar to the treatment of the pharaohs in Egypt.

In 1390, the current Candelaria was a solitary and deserted place where the shepherds would frenguent the Guanches of Güimar's menceyato (Güímar's pre-Hispanic kingdom). One evening, two natives who were leading his cattle, saw some goats come to the mouth of the ravine. The natives found, on a rock, the Holy Image of the Virgin of Candelaria (declared principal patron saint of the Canary Islands with posteriority).

The image was found in a beach near to Candelaria, initially the image was moved to the Cave of Chinguaro, which was the palace of the King of Güímar.

But later, the same guanches moved her to Cueva de Achbinico in Candelaria, and there it has been venerated since then. The aboriginals identified her with the appearance of their goddess Chaxiraxi (the mother of the gods), but the Christian conquerors insisted that the image was the Virgin Mary. Later a hermitage was constructed and later the Basilica was constructed to Santa Maria.

Nowadays Candelaria is the principal Catholic center of pilgrimage of the Canaries and one of the principal ones of Spain.

The current image of the Virgin of Candelaria is to dress. The image always turns out to be covered by mantles and jeweler's shop, also she is curiously very venerated by the Hindu community of the Canaries, they refer to her as the black virgin. The image goes out in procession every February 2 (day of Candelaria) and August 15 (day of the Patron of Canaries). The latter date is linked to a former aboriginal celebration (Beñesmen, the crop). It is believed that the Virgin Mary appeared on these dates.

Nowadays, the municipality is visited by thousands of people, not only devout to the Virgin of Candelaria, but tourists exploring the Canary culture.

Historical population

Sites of interest

The municipality has a beach located to the east and is famous for tourism. Candelaria's municipality receives the annual peregrination of Candelaria (on February 2 and on August 15, the latter is the most important), as well as to the pilgrims who visit the municipality in all other epochs of the year. The principal stops of any visit are the Basilica of Candelaria and Cueva de Achbinico, but there are other places of interest in the village:

Basilica of Candelaria
The current basilica dates back of 1959, it was constructed on a former hermitage. When you leave the basilica you stand out on the belfry coast, to your feet one finds the Plaza de la Patrona de Canarias. Since the image of the Virgin was appearing on the beach of Chimisay, around 1392, the first great Sanctuary to the Virgin of Candelaria was constructed in 1668. Later with the increase of the peregrinations of the devout ones, there was created the need to construct a bigger temple (the current basilica), which has capacity for 5,000 persons.

The basilica is in the south part of the city, adjacent to the Atlantic Ocean. Close to the Plaza de la Patrona de Canarias they find the bronze statues of 9 aboriginal kings. Next to the basilica is the Dominican convent religious order in charge of the sanctuary. The basilic also has a large collection of wall paintings. The temple and Royal Basilica Marian Shrine of Our Lady of Candelaria, is considered the main temple dedicated to the Virgin Mary in the Canary Islands.

Cueva de Achbinico
Also so called Cave of San Blas, it was the first Christian temple of Canary Islands, in this place the original inhabitants of the Canary Islands produced worship to the Virgin of Candelaria. According to recent archaeological layers of ash found and submitted for consideration are carbon-14 dating back over three thousand years. In this cave a fire was kept on permanently, something like the temple of the Vestal Virgins of ancient Rome.

Plaza de la Patrona de Canarias
The Plaza de la Patrona de Canarias (Square of the Saint Patron of the Canary Islands) his a large square in Candelaria. It is next to the Basilica of Candelaria, a meeting place of pilgrims and festivities celebrating the most important of the municipality. In this square there are also various bars and cafes. On one side of the square are statues of the nine kings who ruled the nine aboriginal guanches menceyatos (pre-Hispanic kingdoms) of Tenerife.

Calle Obispo Pérez Cáceres
It is the shopping street of the town par excellence where you can find different souvenir stores, religious imagery and crafts. The street runs parallel to the coast and the promenade of the city to the Plaza de la Patrona de Canarias and the Basilica of Candelaria.

Iglesia de Santa Ana
It is a church dedicated to St. Anne, mother of the Virgin Mary and is the parish in the municipality of Candelaria. The church is the mid-eighteenth century, but was built on a sixteenth-century chapel. The temple has many religious images of great religious and artistic intervals.

Festivals 

 Virgin of Candelaria, Liturgical Feast: February 2.
 Saint Blaise: 3 February.
 Carnival of Candelaria: February–March in the year, with an important meeting of carnival street bands.
 Festival Intercultural India - Canarias, "Intercultural Festival India - Canary Islands": First Sunday in May.
 Virgin of Carmen and Saint Anne: July 16 and July 26 respectively.
 Festival de la Canción de Candelaria, "Festival of Candelaria Song": Held in July, this festival is taking root as one of the most important of the islands to be held the 10th edition in 2005.
 Virgin of Candelaria, Popular Festival: 14 to 15 August (central days).

Sisters cities
 Arafo, Tenerife, Spain
 Güímar, Tenerife, Spain
 Candelaria, Cuba
 Teror, Gran Canaria, Spain
 Rota, Cádiz, Spain

Photos

See also

List of municipalities in Santa Cruz de Tenerife

References

External links
 Official web page of the municipality.

Municipalities in Tenerife